Leucopogon margarodes is a species of flowering plant in the heath family Ericaceae and is endemic to near-coastal areas of eastern Australia. It is an erect, spreading shrub with egg-shaped leaves with the narrower end towards the base, and small numbers of white, tube-shaped flowers usually arranged singly or in pairs in upper leaf axils.

Description
The leaves are covered with bristly hairs, edges of the leaves are rolled under and have fine teeth.

Taxonomy
Leucopogon margarodes was first formally described in 1810 by Robert Brown in his Prodromus Florae Novae Hollandiae et Insulae Van Diemen.

Distribution and habitat
This leucopogon grows in coastal heath, forest and woodland in near-coastal areas from south-eastern Queensland to as far south as Wondabyne in New South Wales.

References

margarodes
Ericales of Australia
Flora of New South Wales
Flora of Queensland
Plants described in 1810
Taxa named by Robert Brown (botanist, born 1773)